Myles Cornwall (born September 12, 1998) is a Canadian professional soccer player who plays as a left-back for Fort Wayne FC in USL League Two.

Early life
Cornwall was born in Ottawa and began playing youth soccer with the Ottawa Royals, followed by Ottawa South United.

He attended Sir Robert Borden High School before attending Walsh University in the United States. At Walsh, he scored 22 goals in 72 appearances over four seasons while playing as a forward.

Club career
From 2017 to 2021, Cornwall played for Ottawa South United in League1 Ontario and later the Première Ligue de soccer du Québec. On May 31, 2017, he scored his first senior goals, netting two goals in a League Cup match against ProStars FC. He scored his first league goal on June 26, 2017, also against ProStars FC.

Cornwall was recommended by his OSU coach Jim Lianos to Canadian Premier League club Atlético Ottawa, who had an affiliation with OSU and were in need of a defender. After training with Atlético for three weeks, Cornwall signed his first professional contract for the remainder of the 2021 season on August 28. The following day, he made his debut as a starter in a 2–2 draw against HFX Wanderers.

In 2022, he joined USL League Two club Fort Wayne FC.

Career statistics

References

External links

1998 births
Living people
Association football defenders
Canadian soccer players
Soccer players from Ottawa
Canadian expatriate soccer players
Expatriate soccer players in the United States
Canadian expatriate sportspeople in the United States
Walsh University alumni
Ottawa South United players
Atlético Ottawa players
League1 Ontario players
Première ligue de soccer du Québec players
Canadian Premier League players
Walsh Cavaliers
College men's soccer players in the United States